Peter Mráz may refer to:

 Peter Mráz (footballer, born 1985), Slovak football defender
 Peter Mráz (footballer, born 1975), Slovak football midfielder